Agudath Israel can refer to any of several related organizations, including:

World Agudath Israel, an international movement
Agudath Israel of America, an American organization
Agudat Yisrael, an Israeli political party